Kentico Xperience is a web content management system. Kentico Xperience uses ASP.NET and Microsoft SQL Server for development using Visual Studio, or through Microsoft MVC (formerly Portal Engine). Kentico Xperience is also compatible with Microsoft Azure. The most recent version is Kentico Xperience 13. It was launched on October 27, 2020 and is updated regularly. The last update was released on November 24, 2021.

History
Kentico Xperience is developed by Kentico Software. The company was founded in 2004 by Petr Palas and is based in Brno, Czech Republic. In 2008, Kentico Xperience opened its first US office and, in 2011, added an office in the UK and a second office in the US. An Australian office was opened in 2012, and a Benelux Amsterdam office opened in 2015.

External links
 Official Kentico Xperience website

References

Blog software
Internet forum software
Content management systems